Sweet Dreams is the debut studio album by German Eurodance duo La Bouche. Four singles were released from the album: "Sweet Dreams", "Be My Lover", "Fallin' in Love" and "I Love to Love". The album was very successful all over the world, reaching number two in Finland and Switzerland, and number three in Germany. It sold to gold in countries like Canada, Finland, Germany, Hong Kong, Japan, Poland and Switzerland.

Critical reception
J.D. Considine from The Baltimore Sun complimented Thornton's voice, as a classic soul singer, "blessed with power, tone and an impressive interpretive ability". Gil L. Robertson IV from Cash Box wrote, "Their vocal delivery is crisp, fresh and full of personality that should provide them with a winning edge in the highly competitive world of dance/R&B." He highlighted "Sweet Dreams", "Nice 'N' Slow", "Do You Still Need Me" and "Be My Lover". Chuck Eddy from Entertainment Weekly found that "their electro-boogie keyboards, chesty diva choruses, and bellowed raps are irksomely interchangeable with any old C+C Music Factory hit: the sound of house music spinning its wheels." Lynn Dean Ford from Indianapolis Star said the "real treats" on the album include a remake of Hamilton, Joe Frank & Reynolds' 1975 hit "Fallin' in Love", "which La Bouche turns into an engaging R&B shuffle; "Do You Still Need Me", a ballad with an understated country feel; and "Shoo Bee Do Bee Do (I Like it That Way)", a jaunty, hook- filled, midtempo ditty with a jangly rhythm guitar. Through it all, Thornton emerges as a talented vocalist who probably would jam harder on meatier material." Chuck Campbell from Knoxville News Sentinel stated that the duo "manages some functional rhythms similar to "Be My Lover" on the title track and "I Love to Love"." He felt that La Bouche "pours dance-conscious heart" into "Fallin' in Love", "plus "Nice 'N' Slow" is an agreeable slap-and-stomp number. However, Thornton and McCray stray disastrously from standard dance formula with the swaggering country-esque "Do You Still Need Me" and the mid-tempo "I'll Be There".

Track listing
Adapted from album booklet.

Charts

Weekly charts

Year-end charts

Certifications

Release history

References

1994 debut albums
La Bouche albums